Nu Cephei (ν Cephei) is a class A2, fourth-magnitude supergiant star in the constellation Cepheus. It is a white pulsating α Cygni variable star located about 4,700 light-years from Earth.

ν Cephei is a member of the Cepheus OB2 stellar association, which includes stars such as μ Cephei and VV Cephei.  It began life as an approximately  star around eight million years ago.  It has now exhausted its core hydrogen and expanded and cooled into a supergiant.  Elemental abundance analyses indicate that it has not yet spent time as a red supergiant, which would have brought about convection of fusion products to the surface in a Dredge-up.

ν Cephei is currently about 15 times as massive as the sun, 190 times as large, and 100,000 times as luminous.  Its large size and luminosity cause it to be somewhat unstable and produce irregular pulsations.  This is a common feature of class A and B supergiants, which are grouped as α Cygni variable stars. The brightness changes by at most a tenth of a magnitude.

References

External links

Cephei, Nu
207260
A-type supergiants
Cepheus (constellation)
Alpha Cygni variables
Cephei, 10
107418
8335
Durchmusterung objects